Matilda of Saxony may refer to:

Matilda of Ringelheim (c. 892–968), also known as Saint Matilda, a Saxon noblewoman
Matilda of Saxony, countess of Flanders ( - 1008)
Matilda, Princess-Abbess of Quedlinburg (955 – 999), daughter of Otto I, Holy Roman Emperor, and Adelaide of Italy
Matilda of England, Duchess of Saxony (1156 – 1189), eldest daughter of Henry II of England and Eleanor of Aquitaine; wife of Henry the Lion
Matilda of Saxony (1172-1209/10), Countess of Perche and Lady of Coucy, from the German Welf dynasty; niece of Richard the Lionheart